Japanese plum is a common name for several trees producing edible fruits and may refer to:

Prunus mume
Prunus salicina, native to China
Loquat  (Eriobotrya japonica)

See also
 Prunus japonica, Japanese bush cherry